Henryk Tomasz Reyman (28 July 1897 – 11 April 1963) was a Polish footballer, sports official and military officer. He fought in World War I in the Austrian Army, then in the Polish Army in the Polish-Soviet War, and also participated in the Silesian Uprisings. 

The exact number of goals he scored 
for Wisła Kraków in all of his games is unknown but it's estimated to be over 378 goals (in 328 games)

Sports career
Born in Kraków, Reyman joined Wisła Kraków in 1910 and remained with the club until his death. He made his debut in the first squad in 1914. When Reyman began his career in Wisła it was one of the oldest Polish football clubs but had no great sports success. By the end of his career in 1933 Wisła was already the champions team which year to year was said to prevail in the National Football League. It was him who led the team to great successes and conducted the exceptional and well-recognizable in Poland style of play of the ‘Reds’.

Reyman was the centre forwarder in Wisła. At the beginning he was a magnificent scorer, while as the time passed by he managed to combine these skills with the organization of the whole attack. 
The fans were mostly under the impression of his strikes and scored goals. He scored from free or penalty kicks, from solo dribble runs or from the passes of his co-players. He could strike with any allowable part of a body: from slightly disdained tips to headers. Experts underlined the power and the technique of his strikes.

One anecdote rendering in an appropriate way his dynamite in legs refers to the match against the Romanian club - Fulgerul. Reyman scored 4 goals while one strike was a volley kick on the run. That strike was so powerful that the Romanian goalkeeper went into the goal with the ball and fell unconscious for a couple of minutes. No wonder that goalkeepers quailed at the sight of him shooting.

His extraordinary effectiveness he showed during the National League seasons. The league verified value of players. He passed the exam with flying colours as the top scorer. His 37 goals in 23 official league matches in 1927 is still the unbeaten record until today.
The talent of leading Wisła attack formation was his next asset. He had a phenomenal ability to read the play and to distribute the ball to his teammates. Thanks to him Wisła presented a unique yet well-recognizable style of play and the character which was the aggressive, hard, solid and ambitious play to the end, regardless the result.  As a captain of the ‘Reds’ for over 10 years he conducted the play of the team.

It is worth mentioning here that Wisła enjoyed greatest successes throughout interwar with no coach support. It happened so when they won the National Cup and the League Championship twice (1926–1928). As a team captain Reyman had to take the coach position and it was him who set up tactics and the squad for each game.

He astonished the contemporary public with his devotion and commitment for the “White Star”.
Wisła with Reyman were as one and no one would imagine any match of the ‘Reds’ without his performance and obviously he did not disappoint the fans. All the more while serving in the army in Vilnius he had to wander through the night by train in order to be ready to play the match next day for the beloved team. It happened once that he got late coming back from the military manoeuvres. He just dismounted the horse at the Jagiellonian University building and rushed the distance of two kilometres to the stadium. As soon as he reached it he was asked if he would be up to the difficult match. He replied: If only the teammates take up the play in 10 for several minutes, before I cool down and change, then I am ready... and so it was, and within couple of minutes after the first whistle a storm of applause announced entering the football pitch by the audience favourite. He paid it back scoring two goals.

To describe the indomitableness of his spirit the most spectacular and dramatic game in the club history should be recalled. It was a local derby match against Cracovia on 3 May 1925. Three days before the game he had his leg in a cast. He yielded however to the persuasions of the coach Schlosser and decided to step onto the pitch even if to assist and keep up the fighting spirit in the team. The sticking plaster was removed on Friday and he managed to hobble into the field on Sunday. The first half was the most dreadful in the history of all derbies. Wisła was losing 1 to 5. The Striped spectators were mad with joy. The Cracovian fans and players filled with elation kissed each other all drunk with happiness. It looked like a massacre on the so-far unprecedented scale.

At half-time a miracle happened in Wisła locker room. There Reyman became the man of the moment and is supposed to call for his pals: “Anybody who does not feel up to giving all the best in the second half to clear our names of the shame hanging over us now should not re-enter the pitch (…). No one demands only victories from you. Sometimes you can be defeated. But everyone has the right to expect ambitious and tenacious play from you. Don’t let it happen that people consider you as unworthy of… giving a hand”.

It is clear what this hard talk resulted in. A completely new Wisła team walked into the pitch for the second half, the team which showed their character. They were people who had more in common than just playing football together, for whom honour and defence of the club colours of the beloved team were not just empty words. The team fought back with full commitment to the end, not giving up despite unfavourable circumstances and seemingly in the hopeless situation. Like he remembered afterwards: “We decided to play to the bitter end. We fought like tigers, we got to all the balls, I did not feel pain… we equalized”. Reyman worked superbly in this match and a fortune rewarded his efforts with 4 goals on his record (the last one 10 minutes before the end among the wild enthusiasm of Wisła fans). The game ended at the dusk falling which generously hid the blushes on faces of Cracovian players who were to achieve a great triumph but struggled to hold on to a draw in the last minutes of this dramatic match. Leaving the locker room Reyman is reputed to say to his teammates: “You’ve saved the honour of Wisła”.

He remained an indisputable leader of his team till his last play for Wisła. It was after he ended his career to discover how important he was for the team. Before World War 2 broke out, when he was missing on the pitch ‘The Reds’ being still the top-team were not able to grab the National League title.

Career achievements
In the years 1910 to 1933, Reyman played for Wisła Kraków, scoring 109 goals between 1927-1933. Among his career highlights were:
 Winning the Polish championship twice in consecutive seasons with Wisła (1927, 1928)
 Top-scorer in the Polish Soccer League twice in consecutive seasons with 37 goals in 1927 and 30 goals in 1928
 Twelve caps for the Poland national team
 Captain of the national team at the 1924 Olympic Games in Paris

Years after career's end
Reyman never gave up with the sport after he stopped playing. He began to work in the organisation of the Kutno Football sub-district Union even before the war. After the Second World War he played the predominant role in reviving this Kutno Union and the Polish Football Association. He was appointed as a coach of the Poland national team until 1948 when he was dismissed and removed from working for sport as a result of Stalin's purges.

During the political thaw in 1956 he took an active part in re-establishing of the ruined in Stalinist times sports unions and associations. As a union captain of Polish National Football Association between 1956 and 1958 he conducted the Polish team in memorable matches with The Soviet Union in 1957 (in World Cup qualifying matches).

Reyman worked for TS Wisła club till his death acting among others as an incumbent Vice-President, an honorary captain of the First Squad and an honorary President of The Company.
He died on 11 April 1963 in Kraków.

In recognition of his achievements, a street in Kraków is named after him, as is the rebuilt Wisła Kraków stadium.

References

External links
  Profile

1897 births
1963 deaths
People from the Kingdom of Galicia and Lodomeria
Footballers from Kraków
Association football forwards
Polish football managers
Polish footballers
Olympic footballers of Poland
Footballers at the 1924 Summer Olympics
Wisła Kraków players
Ekstraklasa players
Polish people of World War I
Austro-Hungarian military personnel of World War I
Silesian Uprisings participants
Polish people of the Polish–Soviet War
Poland international footballers
Recipients of the Medal of Independence